Camanchia is a genus of synziphosurine, a paraphyletic group of fossil chelicerate arthropods. Camanchia was regarded as part of the clade Prosomapoda. Fossils of the single and type species, C. grovensis, have been discovered in deposits of the Silurian period in Iowa, in the United States. Alongside Venustulus, Camanchia is one of the only Silurian synziphosurine with fossil showing evidence of appendages.

The prosoma of Camanchia covered by a smoothly curved subtriangular carapace with broad doublure (ventral thickening run through the margin of carapace). Detail of the 6 prosomal appendage pairs (chelicerae+5 leg pairs) obscure, at least the first leg pair (appendage II) have spur-like terminations. Opisthosoma is externally 10-segmented with tergites possses blunt pleurae (lateral extension). The last 3 opisthosomal segments forming a narrow postabdomen with short pleurae. Telson is yet to be discovered. The carapace margin and pleurae possess tubercles.

References

Synziphosurina
Prosomapoda
Silurian first appearances
Silurian arthropods
Fossils of the United States
Fossil taxa described in 2011